Fibrillithecis sprucei is a species of lichen in the family Thelotremataceae. It was described as new to science in 2011. Found in Brazil, the specific epithet sprucei honors botanist Richard Spruce.

References

Ostropales
Lichen species
Lichens described in 2011
Lichens of Brazil
Taxa named by Helge Thorsten Lumbsch
Taxa named by Robert Lücking